Aminoacridine may refer to any of several chemical compounds:

 2-Aminoacridine
 3-Aminoacridine
 4-Aminoacridine
 9-Aminoacridine